Don Andrews (born 26 April 1947) is a Canadian sailor. He competed in the Flying Dutchman event at the 1972 Summer Olympics.

References

External links
 

1947 births
Living people
Canadian male sailors (sport)
Olympic sailors of Canada
Sailors at the 1972 Summer Olympics – Flying Dutchman
Sportspeople from Edmonton